John Wentworth Jr. (July 17, 1745 – January 10, 1787) was a Founding Father of the United States and a lawyer who served as a New Hampshire delegate to the Continental Congress, where he signed the Articles of Confederation.

Biography
He was born to Judge John Wentworth in Somersworth, New Hampshire in 1745, and is a descendant of "Elder" William Wentworth. He graduated from Harvard in 1768 before studying law. He moved to Dover, New Hampshire where he started his practice. His cousin, Governor Wentworth, appointed him the probate register for Strafford County, and he held that post until his death.

He was active in the various revolutionary committees, and was elected to the convention (later the State Assembly) from Dover every year from 1776 to 1780. He was a member of the state council, supporting Meshech Weare, from 1780 to 1784, and was a member of the New Hampshire Committee of Safety. That committee operated as the revolutionary government when the Assembly was not in session.

In 1778 and 1779, he was selected as one of the delegates to the Continental Congress. His term of service gave him the chance to sign the Articles of Confederation when the Congress passed that plan to unify the colonies. As New Hampshire established a more stable government, he was elected to the State's Senate from 1784 to 1786. He died in Dover and is buried in the Pine Hill Cemetery there.

Notes

References
 
 

1745 births
1787 deaths
American people of English descent
Harvard University alumni
Continental Congressmen from New Hampshire
18th-century American politicians
Signers of the Articles of Confederation
People of colonial New Hampshire
People from Somersworth, New Hampshire
People from Dover, New Hampshire
Founding Fathers of the United States